Town Hills is a mountain in Barnstable County, Massachusetts. It is located in Provincetown in the Town of Provincetown. Oak Head is located north-northeast of Town Hill.

References

Mountains of Massachusetts
Mountains of Barnstable County, Massachusetts